Mukesh Rishi (born 19 April 1956) is an Indian actor and film producer who works primarily in Hindi and Telugu films. He has also appeared in Malayalam, Kannada, Punjabi, Marathi and Tamil films. He got his first break in Hindi in 1988 and has since, established himself as a leading character actor.

Although he started his career in films as a villain, after he was regularly cast as a villain. He joins a list of non-Telugu speaking actors, such as Amrish Puri, Puneet Issar, Paresh Rawal, Sharat Saxena, Pradeep Rawat, Narendra Jha, Rahul Dev, Mukul Dev, Sonu Sood, Ashutosh Rana, Sachin Khedekar, Boman Irani, and Sayaji Shinde who have successfully established themselves in Telugu movies.

Early life 
Rishi was born in Jammu. After his graduation from Government College, Sector 11, Chandigarh, and working for two years in Mumbai, Rishi went to work in Fiji where he met his wife of Fijian-Indian descent. Her family ran a traditional departmental store. He has a lucrative Investment Portfolio including Warehouse Investements.

After marriage, they went to New Zealand, where Mukesh started his career as a model. However, he could hardly find time for modelling due to a busy work schedule and was dissatisfied with his modelling assignments. After seven years, he returned to Mumbai, India and enrolled in Roshan Taneja's acting school.

Filmography

Hindi

Telugu

Malayalam

Kannada 
 Bhoopathi (2007) Aravind Ram
 Bombaat (2008)
 School Master (2010)
 Kanteerava (2011)
 Maryade Ramanna (2011)
 James (2022)

Punjabi 
 Mitter Pyare Nu Haal Mureedan Da Kehna(2004)
Waris Shah: Ishq Daa Waaris (2006)
 Taur Mittran Di (2012)
 Jatt James Bond (2014)
Sikka(2015)
Ishq My Religion(2019)

Bhojpuri 

Dulhan Chahi Pakistan Se (2016)

Tamil 
 En Vazhi Thani Vazhi (2015) as Bhai
 Singam 2 (2013) as Bhai, partner of Thangaraj (Rahman)
 Ramana (2002) as Jalandhar Singh
 Vallarasu (2000) as Wasim Khan

Marathi 
  Balgandharva (film)  (2011) as Pathan
  Truckbhar Swapna (2021) as R.K.
 Sher Shivraj (2022) as Afzalkhan

Odia 
 Aakhi Palakare Tu (2010)

Television serials
 The Sword of Tipu Sultan (1990)
 Chittod Ki Rani Padmini Ka Johur (2009)
 Prithvi Vallabh  (2018)

Web series
 Abhay (2019)

Awards and nominations
2000: Nominated: Filmfare Award for Best Supporting Actor - Sarfarosh
2003: Nominated: Filmfare Award for Best Villain - Telugu - Indra
2004: Nominated: Filmfare Award for Best Villain - Telugu - Seetayya

References

External links
 

Living people
Male actors in Hindi cinema
Male actors in Telugu cinema
Indian male film actors
21st-century Indian male actors
Male actors in Tamil cinema
Male actors in Kannada cinema
Male actors in Malayalam cinema
Male actors from Jammu and Kashmir
People from Kathua district
Male actors in Bengali cinema
Male actors in Bhojpuri cinema
Male actors in Odia cinema
Indian male television actors
Male actors in Hindi television
20th-century Indian male actors
Male actors in Punjabi cinema
1956 births